The Shanghai International Film Festival (French: Festival international du film de Shanghai), abbreviated SIFF, is one of the largest film festivals in East Asia.

"China's biggest film festival" according to the Hollywood Reporter. Next to Tokyo International Film Festival, the SIFF is considered by many to be the second biggest film festival in Asia. The first festival was held from October 7 to 14, 1993. In 2003 there was no festival due to the SARS outbreak. Since its beginning in 1993, Shanghai International Film Festival has grown to become an A-category international film festival.

Every June, the 10-day film festival arrives as scheduled, and it has become an important sight in Shanghai's cultural life. The Shanghai Film Festival has screened more than 400 Chinese and foreign films.

SIFF organized by Shanghai Municipal Administration of Culture, Radio, Film & TV and Shanghai Media & Entertainment Group.  It awards several "Golden Goblet" Awards for best film, best director, best actor/actress, and other categories, as well as a "Special Jury Award."  SIFF Mart consists of the Film Market, China Film Pitch and Catch (CFPC), and Co-production Film Pitch and Catch (Co-FPC). The SIFFORUM is a communication platform.

History 
In 2011, SIFF started a "Film Restoration" program to repair and preserve prints of classic Chinese movies.

Notable jury members include Oliver Stone, Mark Rydell, István Szabó, Stanislav Rostotsky, Alan Parker, Lee Chang-Dong, Geoffrey Gilmore, François Girard, Olivier Assayas, Luc Besson, Lisa Lu, Donnie Yen, Chen Hao,  Tran Anh Hung, Chen Kaige, He Ping, Wong Kar-Wai, Bille August, Danny Boyle, Andie Macdowell, John Woo,  Barry Levinson, Paz Vega, Jean-Jacques Annaud, Heather Graham, Li Bingbing, Tom Hooper, Gong Li, Sally Potter, Emir Kusturica, Atom Egoyan, Xu Qing, Sabu, Ildikó Enyedi, Nuri Bilge Ceylan, Zhao Tao, Paolo Genovese and Nicolas Celis.

Other notable attendees include Jesse Eisenberg, Smriti Irani, Kirill Razlogov, Peng Yuyan, Xu Qing, Zhou Yun, Yang Zishan, Thierry Fremaux, Xu Zheng and Amanda Seyfried.

Awards

Golden Goblet Awards
The most prestigious award given out at Shanghai is the Jin Jue ("Golden Goblet") for the Best Feature Film. 
 Best Feature Film
 Jury Grand Prix
 Best Actress
 Best Actor
 Best Director
 Best Screenplay
 Best Music
 Best Cinematography
 Outstanding Artistic Achievement

Asian New Talent Award
An award launched in 2004 aimed at gathering new forces in film creativity, excavating/tapping fresh young faces on screens, and boosting newly made productions by young film makers into worldwide perspective.
 Best Film
 Best Director
 Best Actor
 Best Actress
 Best Scriptwriter
 Best Cinematographer

International Student Shorts Awards
International Student Shorts Award was introduced since the 9th SIFF in 2006, as a stage for the young people to communicate with renowned film masters and to display their works. It is one of the three grand awards of Shanghai International Film Festival, together with Golden Goblet Award and Asian New Talent Award, by which more and more students approach to the world film industry.

 Best Film Award
 Best Director Award
 Best Animation Award
 Best Creative Idea Award
 Special Jury Award

China Movie Channel Media Awards
China Movie Channel Media Awards are presented at each Shanghai International Film Festival by China Movie Channel since 2007. Voted by the reporters in the entertainment industry, the awards are aimed at "promoting medium-and-small-budget homegrown movies and exposing talented young directors and actors".
 
 Best Film
 Best Director
 Best Actor	
 Best Actress	
 Best Supporting Actor	
 Best Supporting Actress

Jackie Chan Action Movie Awards
Jackie Chan Action Movie Awards were presented during the Jackie Chan Action Movie Week during the SIFF between 2015 and 2018. Voted by the reporters in the entertainment industry, the awards are aimed at "celebrating international action movies and honoring those who have made outstanding contributions to the genre." In 2019, these awards became their own event held separately from the SIFF. 
 
 Best Action Movie
 Best Action Movie Director
 Best Action Choreographer
 Best Action Movie Actor
 Best Action Movie Actress
 Best Action Movie New Performer
 Best Special Effects
 Best Fight

See also 
 Cinema of China
 Film festivals
 List of film festivals in China

References

External links

Shanghai International Film Festival official site
IMDb entry
State of the Shanghai International Film Festival by Casey Hall, CNN International, 8 June 2011
13th Shanghai International Film Festival CRI

 
Film festivals established in 1993
Film festivals in China
Annual events in Shanghai
1993 establishments in China